Events in the year 2016 in Greece.

Incumbents
President: Prokopis Pavlopoulos
Prime Minister: Alexis Tsipras
Speaker: Nikos Voutsis

Events
 January 11 – Kyriakos Mitsotakis becomes the leader of the Opposition as he becomes president of New Democracy.

Deaths

January
 January 6 – Ioannis Petridis, politician (born 1931)
 January 7 – Anna Synodinou, actress and politician (born 1927)

November
 November 20 – Konstantinos Stephanopoulos, 90, Former Greek President

Predicted and Scheduled Events

August
August 5–21 – 51 athletes from Greece will compete at the 2016 Summer Olympics in Rio de Janeiro, Brazil

See also
 Second Cabinet of Alexis Tsipras

References

 
2010s in Greece
Years of the 21st century in Greece
Greece
Greece